Roger Michael Tompkins is a travel creative, director, producer, father, dog owner and sometimes, fishing guide.

60-70’s New Zealand and Rock & Roll 
Roger Michael Tompkins visited New Zealand in 1967 and spent the late sixties and early seventies travelling. Hitchhiked from New Zealand to England overland via Australia, Malaysia, Thailand, Indian, Afghanistan, and Iran to Europe. Lived in Paris and London before returning to New Zealand. 

 1973 a stage manager The Great Ngaruawahia Music Festival in New Zealand; Black Sabbath. 

 1973 Tour-managed Lindisfarne, Slade, Status Quo Lindisfarne, Charisma Records (Tony Stratton-Smith) & WEA Records (Ron Kass). 

 1975 Worked with Tony Secunda, Steeleye Span ‘All Around My Hat’ top 5 in the UK charts.

Mid-seventies entered the UK film industry. Worked mostly on television commercials Bob Bierman, Len Fulford, Michael Seresin, Ross Crammer and Tony Scott. 1978 Eric Idle ‘The Rutles’ Produced by Lorne Michaels NBC’s Saturday Night Live. 1979/80 London & Los Angeles Pink Floyd’s ‘The Wall’ as animation liaison/coordination with Roger Waters/Gerald Scarf

80's & beyond 
At 1981 he set up Cranbrook Films leading production company in Australia & New Zealand. As a director/producer Tompkins work is known for casting strong, real-life character’s, subtle humour and atmospheric style. Clients: Apple, Pepsi, Shell, BP, Caltex, Mobil, IBM, Ford, Mitsubishi, GM, Land Rover, Telstra, Telecom, Tooheys, Lion Nathan, Kellogg’s, Pfizer. Director/Co-producer original 100% New Zealand’ global campaign "New Zealand" And Australian Government’s Northern Territories Tourism campaign: “You'll never never know if you never never go.”

'Steinlager' ‘Stick to the script’ (Mel Smith/ Griff Rhys Jones).

Speight’s Southern Man Campaign ‘Good On Ya Mate’

Awards: Cannes, London (LAA), New York (NYAF) Axis, Award, Facts, ATV MADC. Work showcased - in Shots.

1990 directed five episodes of The Ray Bradbury Theatre for Atlantic/HBO.

The noughties 
2006/2011Founding partner in Off The Rails Otago Central Rail Trail, one of NZ’s first specialized bicycle touring companies enabling adventurers to experience New Zealand first and foremost cycle trail

2011-Current 
2011 Our Man in New Zealand Founder-CEO. OMINZ highly respected bespoke travel design company providing curated travel services to client's visiting NZ. Clients range from Hollywood hobo’s to Bombay billionaires, and anyone in between.

 DOP on Chorus "Gigatown" Supreme Award the 2015 TVNZ Marketing Awards

Director short film featuring Hollywood star Sam Neill, The Odyssey released in September 2017* The Odyssey (abridged)

References

Living people
English television directors
Year of birth missing (living people)